Don Kenealy was a New Zealand rugby league player who represented New Zealand.

Early life
Kenealy grew up in the Te Puke area where he attended Te Puke Primary School. He later moved to Auckland and went to Sacred Heart College where he excelled as a cricketer and rugby footballer. He left school in 1909 and in 1910 was playing rugby for Marist Brothers second grade team.

Playing career
Kenealy switched to rugby league in 1911 and played for Eden Ramblers from their foundation in 1911 to 1913. He was a back and captained the side in 1913. During the 1913 season the Eden senior team disbanded and Kenealy was granted a transfer by Auckland Rugby League to the City Rovers
. He was selected for the Auckland in 1911 and played 3 matches for them. In 1912 he played 4 matches for Auckland and scored 1 try.

In 1912 he was selected to play for New Zealand on the tour of Australia. No test matches were played on the tour. Following the 1915 season he stopped playing in the Auckland area.

References

New Zealand rugby league players
New Zealand national rugby league team players
Auckland rugby league team players
City Rovers players
Rugby league wingers
Year of birth missing
Place of birth missing
Year of death missing
Place of death missing
People from Te Puke
Rugby league players from the Bay of Plenty Region